Sclerocarya birrea ("hard", and  , "nut", in reference to the stone inside the fleshy fruit), commonly known as the marula, is a medium-sized deciduous fruit-bearing tree, indigenous to the miombo woodlands of Southern Africa, the Sudano-Sahelian range of West Africa, the savanna woodlands of East Africa and Madagascar.

Description
The tree is a single stemmed tree with a wide spreading crown. It is characterised by a grey mottled bark. The tree grows up to 18 m tall mostly in low altitudes and open woodlands. The distribution of this species throughout Africa and Madagascar has followed the Bantu in their migrations. There is some evidence of human domestication of marula trees, as trees found on farm lands tend to have larger fruit size.

The fruits, which ripen between December and March, have a light yellow skin (exocarp), with white flesh (mesocarp). They fall to the ground when unripe and green in colour, and then ripen to a yellow colour on the ground. They are succulent and tart with a strong and distinctive flavour. Inside is a walnut-sized, thick-walled stone (endocarp). These stones, when dry, expose the seeds by shedding 2 (sometimes 3) small circular plugs at one end. The fruits are drupes with a single seed encased within their endocarp, although up to four seeds can be present. The seeds have a delicate nutty flavour and are much sought-after, especially by small rodents who know to gnaw exactly where the plugs are located.

The trees are dioecious. Male trees produce multiple male flowers on a terminal raceme. These have red sepals and petals, and about 20 stamens per flower. On rare occasion a male flower can produce a gynoecium, turning it bisexual. Female flowers grow individually on their own pedicel and have staminodes.  The leaves are alternate, compound, and imparipinnately divided. The leaflet shapes range from round to elliptical.

Taxonomy and etymology
Sclerocarya birrea is divided into three subspecies: subsp. birrea, subsp. caffra and subsp. multifoliolata. These subspecies are differentiated by changes in leaf shape and size. Subsp. birrea is found in northern Africa, subsp. caffra is found in southern Africa, and subsp. multifoliolata is only found in Tanzania.

The generic name Sclerocarya is derived from the Ancient Greek words 'skleros' meaning 'hard' and 'karyon' meaning 'nut'. This refers to the hard pit of the fruit. The specific epithet 'birrea' comes from the common name 'birr', for this type of tree in Senegal. The marula belongs to the same family, Anacardiaceae, as the mango, cashew, pistachio and sumac, and is closely related to the genus Poupartia from Madagascar.

Common names include jelly plum, cat thorn, morula, cider tree, marula, maroola nut/plum, and in Afrikaans, maroela.

Uses

Traditional uses
The fruit is traditionally used for food in Africa, and has considerable socioeconomic importance. The fruit juice and pulp are mixed with water and stored in a container over 1–3 days of fermentation to make marula beer, a traditional alcoholic beverage. The alcoholic distilled beverage (maroela-mampoer) made from the fruit is referenced in the stories of the South African writer Herman Charles Bosman. Marula oil is used topically to moisturise the skin, and as an edible oil in the diet of San people in Southern Africa. The marula tree is protected in South Africa.

Commercial uses
On an industrial level the fruit of the marula tree is collected from the wild by members of rural communities on whose land the trees grow. This harvest and sale of fruit only occurs during two to three months but is an important income to poor rural people, especially women. The fruit is delivered to processing plants where fruit pulp, pips, kernels and kernel oil are extracted and stored for processing throughout the year.

The fruit is used to make the cream liqueur Amarula and also sold as a frozen puree used in juice blends. Marula oil is used as an ingredient in cosmetics.

Uses by other species
The marula fruit is eaten by various animals in Southern Africa.  Giraffes, rhinoceroses and elephants all browse on the marula tree, with elephants in particular being a major consumer.  Elephants eat the bark, branches and fruits of the marula, which may limit the spread of the trees. The damaged bark, due to browsing, can be used to identify marula trees as elephants preferentially target them. Elephants distribute marula seeds in their dung. In the documentary Animals Are Beautiful People by Jamie Uys, released in 1974, some scenes portray elephants, ostriches, warthogs and baboons allegedly becoming intoxicated from eating fermented marula fruit, as do reports in the popular press. While the fruit is commonly eaten by elephants, the animals would need a huge amount of fermented marulas to have any effect on them, and other animals prefer the ripe fruit.

The marula fruit has been suggested to be the food of choice for the ancestral forest-dwelling form of the fruit fly Drosophila melanogaster, which was much more selective about which fruit they preferred than the flies that have self-domesticated themselves to live near to humans. The ancestral fruit flies are triggered by the ester ethyl isovalerate in the marula fruit.

Gallery

References

External links

Swazisecrets.com: Marula African oils

birrea
Flora of Southern Africa
Flora of Madagascar
Flora of South Africa
Desert fruits
Edible nuts and seeds
Fruits originating in Africa
Trees of Madagascar
Trees of South Africa
Protected trees of South Africa
Dioecious plants
Garden plants of Africa
Ornamental trees
Drought-tolerant plants
Drought-tolerant trees